The WWE Women's Tag Team Championship is a women's professional wrestling world tag team championship created and promoted by the American promotion WWE. Unveiled on December 24, 2018, it is the only women's tag team championship on WWE's main roster, and as such, it is available to wrestlers from both the Raw and SmackDown brand divisions. The championship was originally also available to teams from WWE's developmental territory NXT until the establishment of the NXT Women's Tag Team Championship in 2021.

The championship is generally contested in professional wrestling matches, in which participants execute scripted finishes rather than contend in direct competition. The inaugural championship team was Bayley and Sasha Banks, who at the time went by the team name of The Boss 'n' Hug Connection and won the title in a tag team Elimination Chamber match at the 2019 Elimination Chamber event. Becky Lynch and Lita are the current champions in their first reign, both as a team and individually. They defeated Damage CTRL (Dakota Kai and Iyo Sky) on the February 27, 2023, episode of Raw in Grand Rapids, Michigan.

As a team, Bayley and Sasha Banks, Alexa Bliss and Nikki Cross, Nia Jax and Shayna Baszler, and Damage CTRL (Dakota Kai and Iyo Sky) are tied for the most reigns at two, while individually, Cross/A.S.H. (prior to her third reign, her ring name changed to Nikki A.S.H.), Banks, Bliss, and Asuka share the record with three reigns. As a team, The Kabuki Warriors (Asuka and Kairi Sane) have the longest reign at 171 or 172 days (180 days as recognized by WWE due to tape delay), while the team of Bliss and Asuka have the shortest reign at 5 days (4 days as recognized by WWE). As a team, Jax and Baszler have the longest combined reign at 215 days, while individually, Asuka has the longest combined reign at 218 days (225 days as recognized by WWE due to tape delay). Lita is the oldest champion, winning the title at 47 years old, while Rhea Ripley is the youngest, winning it at 24.

Title history

Combined reigns

By team

By wrestler

See also
 Tag team championships in WWE
 Women's championships in WWE

References

External links
 Official Women's Tag Team Title History

Women's professional wrestling tag team championships
WWE women's championships
WWE tag team championships